Jazz 'Round the World is an album by American jazz multi-instrumentalist Yusef Lateef featuring performances recorded in 1963 for the Impulse! label.

Reception
The Allmusic review by Jason Ankeny stated: "Yusef Lateef's first Impulse! date Jazz 'Round the World anticipates the emerging vogue for global music with a series of impassioned interpretations of traditional ethnic folk songs... Lateef proves that while music may indeed reign as the universal language, some speakers are far more fluent and eloquent than others".

Track listing
All compositions by Yusef Lateef except where noted.
 "Abana" - 2:20
 "India" - 4:09
 "You, So Tender and Wistful" - 2:29
 "Yusef's French Brother" - 4:10
 "The Volga Rhythm Song" - 2:03
 "Trouble In Mind" (Richard M. Jones) - 3:12
 "The Good Old Roast Beef of England" - 2:31
 "Raisins And Almonds" - 3:05
 "Utopia" - 2:47
 "Ringo Oiwake" (Fujio Ozawa, Masao Yoneyama) - 4:18
Recorded at Rudy Van Gelder Studio in Englewood Cliffs, New Jersey on December 19 & 20, 1963

Personnel
Yusef Lateef – tenor saxophone, flute, bassoon, oboe, shenai
Richard Williams – trumpet
Hugh Lawson – piano
Ernie Farrow – bass
Lex Humphries – drums

References

Impulse! Records albums
Yusef Lateef albums
1963 albums
Albums recorded at Van Gelder Studio
Albums produced by Bob Thiele